Israeli barrier may refer to:

 Israel–Gaza barrier
 Israeli West Bank barrier
 Israel–Egypt barrier